An epidemic is a disease that spreads rapidly.

Epidemic may also refer to:

 A particular epidemic; see list of epidemics
 COVID-19 pandemic (2019–present) of COVID-19 caused by SARS-CoV-2
 Spanish flu (1918–1920) of influenza caused by H1N1 influenzavirus
 Black Death (14th century) of bubonic plague caused by Yersinia pestis
 Plague of Justinian (6th century) of plague caused by Yersinia pestis

Books
Epidemic!, a 1961 novel by Frank G. Slaughter
Of The Epidemics, a medical book by Hippocrates

Music
Epidemic (band), a San Francisco Bay Area thrash metal band from the late 1980s and early 1990s
Epidemic Records, a record label

Records
Epidemic (album), a 1989 album by Polish heavy metal band Turbo
Epidemic (EP), a 2014 EP by New Years Day
E.P.idemic, a 2004 EP by Craig's Brother
The Epidemics, a 1986 pop album by Indian violinist L. Shankar and British musician Caroline

Songs
"Epidemic" (song), by Polo G
"Epidemic", a song by Slayer on the 1986 album, Reign in Blood
"Epidemic", a song by New Years Day on the 2014 EP, Epidemic

Other uses
Epidemic (film), a 1987 film
Epidemic (video game), a first-person shooter video game
Epidemic Marketing, a former viral marketing company
Epidemic, the original Russian title of To the Lake, a 2019 television series

See also

 
 
Epidemic of Violence
Sexidemic
Endemic
Pandemic (disambiguation)